Operation Phoenix was an operation in 1983 by the South African Defence Force and South West African Territorial Force in response to a major incursion by PLAN fighters from Angola into the white farming areas of northern South West Africa.

Background
SWAPO's military wing PLAN had created a specialised infiltration unit called Volcano. Members of this unit had spent the second half of 1982 receiving training from East German, Cuban and Russian instructors and were regarded as best PLAN soldiers. By January 1983, 1000 to 1700 members of Volcano began the journey south to the Angolan/South West Africa border. They were then formed into fourteen companies of 50 to 70 soldiers. Their mission was for thirteen of those companies, was to cross the border and engage the SWATF and SADF forces while the last company would not engage those forces but instead head southwards to the white farming areas of northern South West Africa.

Operation
On the 13 February 1983, the thirteen companies headed into Kaokoland, Ovamboland and Kavango. The fourteenth company headed for the white farmers in Kamanjab, Outjo, Tsumeb and Otjiwarongo areas. The South African forces operation began on 15 February when the incursions came to their attention. By the beginning of March the PLAN soldiers in the main force, who were kept busy by the SADF/SWATF forces, had taken 155 casualties but had succeeded in laying mines and attacking and kidnapping civilians. The small PLAN force, being chased by the South Africans, were now 50 km from the white farming areas. By early March, the smaller force had reached the farmlands and had attacked a homestead. But by early April, SADF/SWATF soldiers had caught up to the group and no PLAN fighters from the fourteenth unit were alive and had failed to achieve their objectives. The operation wound down with mopping-up operations and ended on 15 April.

Aftermath
In the two-month operation 27 members of the SADF and SWATF lost their lives with PLAN's Volcano unit losing 309 fighters. Civilian casualties totalled 33 dead and 161 kidnapped and taken back to SWAPO bases in Angola.

References

Conflicts in 1983
1983 in South Africa
1983 in South West Africa
1983 in Angola
Battles and operations of the South African Border War
February 1983 events in Africa
March 1983 events in Africa
April 1983 events in Africa